Naether or Näther is a German surname. Notable persons with the surname include:

 Carl Naether (1892–1990), professor and aviculturist
 Max Näther (1899–1919), German fighter pilot

German-language surnames